Little Susie is an album by pianist Ray Bryant  released on Columbia Records in 1960.

Reception 

The AllMusic review stated "Pianist Ray Bryant's debut for Columbia was named after 'Little Susie,' a hit single he had a short time earlier recorded for Signature. The trio LP with bassist Tommy Bryant and either Gus Johnson or Eddie Locke on drums has a remake of 'Little Susie,' a few other originals that did not catch on as hits".

Track listing 
All compositions by Ray Bryant except where noted
 "Little Susie"4:40
 "By Myself" (Howard Dietz, Arthur Schwartz)3:20
 "Blues For Norine"4:35
 "Moon-Faced, Starry-Eyed" (Kurt Weill, Langston Hughes)3:27
 "Big Buddy"5:37
 "Willow Weep for Me" (Ann Ronell)5:12
 "Greensleeves" (Traditional)2:26
 "So In Love" (Cole Porter)5:41
 "If I Can Just Make It" (Traditional)2:12
 "Misty" (Erroll Garner)4:04
Recorded at Columbia Records, 30th Street Studio, NYC., on December 10, 1959 (tracks 1–3 & 10) and January 19, 1960 (tracks 4–9)

Personnel 
Ray Bryant – piano
Tommy Bryant – bass
Oliver Jackson (tracks 1–3 & 10), Eddie Locke (tracks 4–9) – drums

References 

1960 albums
Ray Bryant albums
Columbia Records albums